Viola renifolia is a species of violet known by the common names white violet and kidneyleaf violet. It is native to northern North America, where it has a widespread distribution across Canada and the northern United States as far south as Washington, Colorado, and New York.

Kidneyleaf violet is a perennial herb growing up to 10 centimeters tall. It does not have stems, rhizomes, or stolons. The kidney-shaped leaf blades are 3 to 6 centimeters long and are borne on petioles up to 15 centimeters long. The flower is 1 to 1.5 centimeters long and white in color with purple lines on the lower three petals. The fruit is a purplish capsule.

This violet grows in white spruce and black spruce forests, and temperate coniferous forests. Near the Great Lakes it grows in swamps and wooded areas.

Conservation status in the United States
It is listed as endangered in Connecticut,  as threatened in Iowa, as extirpated in Pennsylvania, and as sensitive in Washington.

References

External links

renifolia